Emilio Trivini (5 April 1938 – 27 August 2022) was an Italian rower who had his best achievements in the coxed fours. In this event he won a silver medal at the 1964 Summer Olympics and a bronze at the 1964 European Championships. His team finished fourth at the 1968 Games.

References

External links
 
 
 
 

1938 births
2022 deaths
Italian male rowers
Olympic rowers of Italy
Rowers at the 1964 Summer Olympics
Rowers at the 1968 Summer Olympics
Olympic silver medalists for Italy
Sportspeople from the Province of Como
Olympic medalists in rowing
Medalists at the 1964 Summer Olympics
European Rowing Championships medalists